The International Centre for Counter-Terrorism (ICCT) is an independent think tank providing multidisciplinary policy advice and practical support focused on prevention and the rule of law, two important parts of effective counter-terrorism work. ICCT's work focuses on themes at the intersection of countering violent extremism and criminal justice sector responses, as well as human rights related aspects of counter-terrorism. The major project areas concern countering violent extremism, rule of law, foreign fighters, country and regional analysis, rehabilitation, civil society engagement and victims' voices.

Functioning as a nucleus within the international counter-terrorism network, ICCT connects experts, policymakers, civil society actors and practitioners from different fields by providing a platform for productive collaboration, practical analysis, and exchange of experiences and expertise, with the ultimate aim of identifying innovative and comprehensive approaches to preventing and countering terrorism.

History 
ICCT was established in The Hague in 2010, after an initiative originating in the Netherlands' parliament with a motion by Dutch Member of Parliament Coskun Çörüz in April 2008. ICCT is supported by the Netherlands Ministry of Foreign Affairs and ICCT began as a unique partnership between three renowned institutions based in The Hague: the T.M.C. Asser Institute, the Netherlands Institute of International Relations Clingendael, and the Institute for Security and Global Affairs (ISGA) at Leiden University College The Hague. Since 2021, ICCT continued as an independent organisation ("Stichting").

Staff 

The current director of ICCT is Thomas Renard. He previously worked at the Egmont Institute, at the Center on Global Counterterrorism Cooperation (as the head of the Brussels office) and with the Jamestown Foundation. He was also Adjunct Professor at the Brussels School of Governance, at the Free University Brussels (2015-21).His research focuses on (counter-)terrorism and (counter-)radicalisation in Europe. His recent research has focused on the evolution of counter-terrorism policy in liberal democracies since 2001, on (returning) foreign fighters, on radicalization in prison and on terrorist recidivism. His latest book is The Evolution of Counter-Terrorism since 9/11 (Routledge, September 2021), whereas his research has been published in many journals and think tanks

ICCT's staff includes a number of scholars and practitioners with expertise in the fields of counter-terrorism and international diplomacy. Prof. Dr. Edwin Bakker is a research fellow at ICCT and is also professor of counter-terrorism studies at the Institute of Public Administration at Leiden University.

Dr. Alex P. Schmid is a visiting research fellow at ICCT and director of the Terrorism Research Initiative (TRI), an international network of scholars working to enhance international security through collaborative research, and he was formerly Officer-in-Charge of the Terrorism Prevention Branch of the United Nations. Prior to his role as research fellow at ICCT, Dr. Alastair Reed held positions was an assistant professor at Utrecht University, where he completed his doctorate on research focused on understanding the processes of escalation and de-escalation in Ethnic Separatist conflicts in India and the Philippines. His main areas of interest are Terrorism and Insurgency, Conflict Analysis, Conflict Resolution, Military and Political Strategy, and International Relations, in particular with a regional focus on South Asia and South-East Asia. His current research projects address the foreign-fighter phenomenon, focusing on motivation and the use of strategic communications.

Max Boon is currently an Associate Fellow at ICCT and has previously worked at Dutch Foreign Ministry where he was responsible for the co-ordination and organization of the Dutch Chairmanship of the International Code of Conduct against Ballistic Missile Proliferation (HCOC). The work of ICCT has been featured in numerous international media.

Activities 

ICCT's work focuses on themes at the intersection of countering violent extremism and criminal justice sector responses, as well as human rights related aspects of counter-terrorism. Its major project areas concern: countering violent extremism, rule of law, foreign fighters, country and regional analysis, rehabilitation, civil society engagement and victims' voices.

ICCT convenes forums and workshops on topics such as radicalization,  foreign fighters  and the legal boundaries of the battlefield.  The centre also frequently conducts training programs, provides technical assistance to missions and carries out country-specific analyses of terrorism and its effects.

Counter-Terrorism Research and Analysis – Working with academics and think thanks on developing policy relevant knowledge on prevention and rule of law based approaches to counter-terrorism, including trends analysis

Policy Advice and Implementation – Bringing together policymakers, experts, civil society actors and frontline practitioners to share expertise, and providing advice, training and capacity building

Monitoring and Evaluation – Systematically assessing counter-terrorism policies and strategies to provide feedback loops between policy and practice and contribute to evidence-based planning and implementation

Training Modules and Summer Programmes – tailored to different target audiences ranging from postgraduates to senior policymakers and judges, on a variety of topics and organised both in-house and on location.

European and international cooperation 

ICCT engages with a vast and diverse network of international organisations, government departments, NGOs, academic institutions, think tanks and civil society organisations from around the globe. The centre works closely with the North Atlantic Treaty Organization (NATO) including various agencies of the United Nations such as the Counter-Terrorism Committee Executive Directorate (CTED); the UN Counter-Terrorism Implementation Task Force (CTITF); the United Nations Interregional Crime and Justice Research Institute (UNICRI); the Global Counterterrorism Forum (GCTF); and the Organization for Security and Co-operation in Europe (OSCE)

Also in the European context, ICCT stands at the forefront of institutional collaboration. It is member of the consortium for the Radicalisation Awareness Network Centre of Excellence and cooperates among others with the European Commission and the European External Action Service.

References

External links 
 
 Clingendael Institute for International Relations - Radicalisation Awareness Network (RAN Practitioners)
 T.M.C. Asser Instituut
 Leiden University, Campus - The Hague

Counterterrorist organizations
Think tanks established in 2010
Organisations based in The Hague
2010 establishments in the Netherlands